Whopper Sacrifice was an advertising campaign by Burger King which was launched in January 2009. After unfriending 10 people on Facebook, people were eligible for a free Whopper by Burger King. Apparently, Burger King told them that they were worth “1/10th of a Whopper”. The app was disabled by Facebook. The campaign was developed by Crispin Porter + Bogusky.

References

External links 

  on the Wayback Machine
 Official Facebook page on the Wayback Machine

Advertising campaigns
Burger King advertising
Facebook criticisms and controversies